Ella Returns to Berlin is a 1961 (see 1961 in music) live album by Ella Fitzgerald, with a trio led by the pianist Lou Levy, and also featuring the Oscar Peterson trio.

The album's title refers to Fitzgerald's more famous concert in Berlin a year earlier (Ella in Berlin: Mack the Knife), which had included her famous rendition of "Mack the Knife", which earned her a Grammy Award for Best Female Vocal Performance (Single).

Like Ella in Rome: The Birthday Concert, this concert was first released thirty years after it was originally recorded, in 1991.

Track listing
For the 1991 Verve-PolyGram CD Reissue, Verve-PolyGram 837 758-2

"Introductions and Announcements"  – 1:20
"Give Me the Simple Life" (Rube Bloom, Harry Ruby)  – 2:03
"Take the "A" Train" (Billy Strayhorn)  – 3:46
"(I'd Like to Get You on a) Slow Boat to China" (Frank Loesser)  – 2:21
Medley: "Why Was I Born?"/"Can't Help Lovin' Dat Man"/"People Will Say We're in Love" (Jerome Kern, Oscar Hammerstein II), (Kern, Hammerstein)/ (Richard Rodgers, Hammerstein) – 5:37
"Introduction" – 0:11
"You're Driving Me Crazy" (Walter Donaldson) – 3:24
"Rock It for Me" (Sue Werner, Kay Werner) – 3:24
"Witchcraft" (Cy Coleman, Carolyn Leigh) – 2:55
"Anything Goes" (Cole Porter) – 2:34
"Cheek to Cheek" (Irving Berlin) – 3:44
"Misty" (Johnny Burke, Erroll Garner) – 2:57
"Caravan" (Duke Ellington, Irving Mills, Juan Tizol) – 2:02
"(If You Can't Sing It) You'll Have to Swing It (Mr. Paganini)" (Sam Coslow) – 4:45
"Mack the Knife" (Marc Blitzstein, Bertolt Brecht, Kurt Weill) – 3:30
"Fanfare for Ella" – 0:22
"'Round Midnight" (Bernie Hanighen, Thelonious Monk, Cootie Williams) – 3:31
"Joe Williams' Blues" (Ella Fitzgerald) – 5:27
"Fanfare for Ella" – 0:53
"This Can't Be Love" (Lorenz Hart, Rodgers) – 4:30
"Closing Announcements by Norman Granz" – 0:54

Personnel 
Recorded February 11, 1961, Berlin, Germany:

 Ella Fitzgerald - Vocals
 Lou Levy - Piano
 Wilfred Middlebrooks - Bass
 Gus Johnson - Drums
 Herb Ellis - Guitar
Track 20 features; The Oscar Peterson Trio 
 Oscar Peterson - Piano
 Ray Brown - Bass
 Ed Thigpen - Drums

References 

Ella Fitzgerald live albums
Albums produced by Norman Granz
1961 live albums
Verve Records live albums
Irving Berlin tribute albums